Platytinospora is a monotypic genus of flowering plants belonging to the family Menispermaceae. The only species is Platytinospora buchholzii.

Its native range is Cameroon.

References

Menispermaceae
Menispermaceae genera
Monotypic Ranunculales genera